Shwet Ashwas, a motorcycle exhibition team of the military police in India, holds the Guinness World Record for making a pyramid of 133 men on 11 motorcycles over a distance of 350 metres at Bangalore on September 22, 1995. 

The team continues to perform in various military events.

External links
 Article on Tribune India
 Article on Hindu.com

Military of India